Sar Choqa-ye Olya (also Romanized as Sar Choqā-ye ‘Olyā and Sar Cheqā ‘Olyā; also known as Sar Chaqā, Sar Cheqā Bālā, and Sar Chogā Bālā) is a village in Vardasht Rural District, in the Central District of Semirom County, Isfahan Province, Iran. At the 2006 census, its population was 44, in 15 families.

References 

Populated places in Semirom County